Mount Weaver is a mountain standing 3 km west of Mount Wilbur at the head of the Scott Glacier, in the Queen Maud region of the Transantarctic Mountains of Antarctica. Discovered and ascended in December 1934 by members of the Byrd AE geological party under Quin Blackburn. Named by them for Charles E. Weaver, professor of paleontology at the University of Washington.

See also
Sunny Ridge

References
 

Queen Maud Mountains
Mountains of the Ross Dependency
Amundsen Coast